Ascalenia pseudofusella is a moth in the family Cosmopterigidae. It was described by Henry Legrand in 1965. It is found on the Seychelles.

References

Moths described in 1965
Ascalenia
Moths of Africa